Saucon Hill is a low mountain in Lehigh County, Pennsylvania. Saucon Hill is located to the southwest of Hellertown. 

It is a part of the Reading Prong of the Appalachian Mountains.

References 

Landforms of Lehigh County, Pennsylvania
Mountains of Pennsylvania